The Sunday Service Choir (commonly referred as Sunday Service) is an American gospel group led by artist and producer Kanye West and conducted by choir director Jason White. Beginning in January 2019, the group has performed every Sunday, as well as Friday, September 27, when West's album Jesus Is King was announced for release. Their debut album, Jesus Is Born, was released three months later on Christmas Day, 2019.

Background
In September 2018, West announced that his ninth studio album Yandhi would be released later in the month. West later postponed the date to November 2018 in order to record in Uganda. The album was postponed a second time in November with no set release date.

On the first Sunday of 2019, West began the first "Sunday Service" rehearsal, where he performed gospel iterations of his discography and other songs with choir group The Samples and frequent collaborators such as Tony Williams, Francis and the Lights, and Ant Clemons. During Sunday Service, several songs from Yandhi have been performed.

On January 12, 2019, it was reported that West was replaced by Ariana Grande as a headliner for Coachella. West pulled out because a giant dome could not be constructed for him.

On March 31, 2019, West announced a Sunday Service performance for Easter would take place at Coachella. The first public Sunday Service performance occurred at Coachella for Easter on April 21, 2019.

On October 5, 2019, West brought Sunday Service to The Gateway in Salt Lake City, UT. His performance occurred on an already busier than usual weekend with the Church of Jesus Christ of Latter-day Saints holding their semi-annual General Conference that weekend as well.

West collaborated with pastor Joel Osteen, who hosted West at Lakewood Church located in Houston, Texas on November 17, 2019. Although the tickets were free for this event as well, those who obtained tickets began to sell them online for up to $500 USD.

On November 21, 2019, Sunday Service announced that they would be a part of the youth Strength to Stand Conference, which would be held at LeConte Center, located in Pigeon Forge, Tennessee from January 18–20, 2020. West's performance was added after comedian John Crist was suspected of sexual misconduct, and Crist's performance was cancelled.

On December 25, 2019, Sunday Service released Jesus is Born as West promised. A year later, on December 25, 2020, Sunday Service released the Emmanuel EP, featuring 5 new tracks composed and produced entirely by West in Latin, based on texts from the Roman Breviary and the Roman Gradual.

Members
List of members adapted from GQ Italia and The Fader.

Kanye West
Jason White – choir director
Jonathan Coleman - choir manager
 Adam Michael Wilson - choir
 Adriana N. Washington - choir
 Akua Willis - choir
 Alana Linsey - choir
 Alayna Rodgers - choir
 Alexander Jacke - choir
 Alexandria A. Arowora - choir
 Alexandria Simone Griffin - choir
 Alex Isley - choir
 Alexis James - choir
 Alexis Jones - choir
 Alisha Roney - choir
 Amanda Adams - choir
 Amber M. Grant - choir
 Ameera Perkins - choir
 Andre M. Washington - choir
 Angela C. Williams - choir
 Angelle King - choir
 Ashley Tamar Davis - choir
 Ashley Echols - choir
 Ashley Nichol - choir
 Ashley Washington - choir
 Ashly Williams - choir
 Bobby Musique Cooks - choir
 Bradley Morice Jones - choir
 Brandi JaNise Majors - choir
 Brandon Rodgers - choir
 Breenen Johnson - choir
 Brittany Jerita Wallace - choir
 Brooke Brewer - choir
 Caleb Minter - choir 
 Carisa Dalton Moore - choir
 Carmel A. Echols - choir
 Cassandra Renee Grigsby Chism - choir
 Cedric Jackson II - choir
 Cedrit B. Leonard Jr. - choir
 Chadric R Johnson - choir
 Chara Hammonds - choir
 Chaz Mason - choir
 Chelsea B Miller - choir
 Chelsea "Peaches" West - choir
 Chimera Wilson - choir
 Claudia A. Cunningham - choir
 Corinthian Buffington - choir
 Crystal Butler McQueen - choir
 Curnita Turner - choir
 Daniel Dávila - choir
 Daniel Ozan - choir
 Danielle E Deimler - choir
 Danielle John-Palmer - choir
 Darius Coleman - choir
 DeAndrea Foster - choir
 Deanna Dixon - choir
 Dejah Gomez-Woods - choir
 Deonis Cook - choir
 Derek Butler - choir
 Derrick Evans - choir
 Desiree Washington - choir
 Destine Nelson - choir
 Devon Baker - choir
 Don Sykes - choir
 Donald "Dep" Paige - choir
 Dwanna Orange - choir
 Ebony Johnson - choir
 Emi Seacrest - choir
 Eric L. Copeland II - choir
 Erik Brooks - choir
 Estherlancia Mercado - choir
 Fallynn Rian Oliver - choir
 Fannie Belle Johnson - choir
 Felice LaZae Martin - choir
 Gabrielle Carreiro - choir
 Gemaine Edwards- choir
 George Hamilton - choir
 Herman Bryant III - choir
 India Moret - choir
 Isaiah Johnson - choir
 Isaiah Steven Jones - choir
 Jacquelyn M. Jones - choir
 Jaden Blakley Gray - choir
 Jamal Moore - choir
 Jasmine L Morrow - choir
 Jasmin Khadia Handon - choir
 JaVonte Pollard - choir
 Jazmine Yvette Bailey - choir
 Jenelle Rose Dunkley - choir
 Jerel Duren - choir
 Jerome Wayne - choir
 JeRonelle McGhee - choir
 Jherimi Leigh Henry - choir
 Joel Echols - choir
 Johnny Lee Paddio JR - choir
 Jordan Rogers - choir
 Joy A. Love - choir
 Justin Hart - choir
 Kadeem S. Nichols - choir
 Kamili Mitchell - choir
 Kaylyn K. Lowery - choir
 Kene Alexander - choir
 Kiandra Richardson - choir
 KieAndria Ellis - choir
 Kimberly A Jefferson - choir
 Kyrese Victoria Montgomery - choir
 LaKeisha Renee Lewis - Choir
 LaMarcus Eldridge - choir
 Landon J. Thomas, IV - choir
 Lanita Smith - choir
 Laurhan Beato - choir
 Maurice Smith - choir
 Mariah Meshae Maxwell - choir
 Marcus James Henderson - choir
 Mark Justin-Paul Hood - choir
 Marqueta Pippens - choir
 Maya Betrece Smith - choir
 Megan Parker - choir
 Melanie S. Tryggestad - choir
 Melissa Miracle McKinney - choir
 Michael Gadlin - choir
 Michael Shorts - choir
 Michelle Harvey - choir
 Naarai Jacobs - choir
 Nava Morris - choir
 Nelson Beato - choir
 Nicole Sheldon - choir
 Olivia Walker - choir
 Orlando Dotson - choir
 Porcha Clay - choir
 Princess Foster - choir
 Reesha Archibald - choir
 Rondez O. Rolle - choir
 Samantha N. Nelson - choir
 Sha’leah Stubblefield - choir
 Shana Andrews - choir
 Shanice Lorraine Knox - choir
 Sharon Marie Norwood - choir
 Shatisha Lawson - choir
 Synai Davis - choir
 Tayler Green - choir
 Taelor Nevin Murphy - choir
 Taneka Lemle - choir
 Tickwanya Jones - choir
 Tiffanie Cross - choir
 Tiffany Stevenson - choir
 Timothy Jenkins - choir
 Vernon Burris Jr - choir
 William Harper - choir
 Zachary C. Moore - choir
Ray Romulus – music supervisor
Ant Clemons – vocalist
Tony Williams – vocalist
Philip Cornish – music director
Nicholas Clark - bass guitarist
Tony Nichols - percussionist
Kyla Moscovich - trumpet
Cameron Johnson - trumpet
Lemar Guillary - trombone
Nikki Grier – songwriter, vocal arranger
Steve Epting Jr. – vocal arranger
Anthony Jawan McEastland - vocal arranger

Discography

Studio albums

Extended plays

Charted songs

As featured artist

Guest appearances

Opera performances
Nebuchadnezzar (2019)
Mary (2019)

References

Musical groups established in 2019
African-American musical groups
2019 establishments in the United States
Kanye West